Ammonia Avenue is the seventh studio album by the British progressive rock band The Alan Parsons Project, released on 7 February 1984 by Arista Records. The Phil Spector-influenced "Don't Answer Me" was the album's lead single, and reached the Top 15 on the US Billboard Hot 100 and Mainstream Rock Tracks charts, as well as the fourth position on the Adult Contemporary chart. The single also reached the Top 20 in several countries and represents the last big hit for the Alan Parsons Project. "Prime Time" was a follow-up release that fared well in the Top 40, reaching No. 34. "You Don't Believe" was the first single in November 1983, reaching #54 on the Billboard Hot 100 and "Since the Last Goodbye" was a minor hit.

Ammonia Avenue is one of the band's biggest-selling albums, carrying an RIAA certification of gold and reaching the Top 10 in a number of countries.

Background and release
The title of the album was inspired by Eric Woolfson's visit to Imperial Chemical Industries (ICI) in Billingham, England, where the first thing he saw was a street with miles of pipes, no people, no trees and a sign that read 'Ammonia Avenue', whose portrait was used for the front cover. The album focuses on the possible misunderstanding of industrial scientific developments from a public perspective and a lack of understanding of the public from a scientific perspective. This album was the second of three recorded on analogue equipment and mixed directly to the digital master tape.

"You Don't Believe" had already been released as both a single and a new song on 1983's The Best of the Alan Parsons Project compilation.

Promotion
Music videos for "Don't Answer Me" and "Prime Time" were produced in 1984, the former with art and animation by MW Kaluta. The latter video is inspired by John Collier's story "Evening Primrose" and features two mannequins, a female and a male one, coming to life and falling in love with each other. About halfway through the video, a street sign for "Ammonia Ave." appears - a reference to the album title.

Reissue
Ammonia Avenue was remastered and reissued in 2008 with bonus tracks, and in 2020 as well, on Blu-Ray audio format, including a high-definition remaster in stereo and multichannel sound, and the two promotional videos of the album as a bonus.

Track listing
All songs written and composed by Alan Parsons and Eric Woolfson.

2008 Bonus Tracks
"Don't Answer Me" (Early Rough Mix)
"You Don't Believe" (Demo)
"Since the Last Goodbye" (Chris Rainbow Vocal Overdubs)
"Since the Last Goodbye" (Eric Guide Vocal – Rough Mix)
"You Don't Believe" (Instrumental Tribute to The Shadows)
"Dancing on a Highwire/Spotlight" (Work in Progress)
"Ammonia Avenue Part 1" (Eric Demo Vocal – Rough Mix)
"Ammonia Avenue" (Orchestral Overdub)

Personnel
 Ian Bairnson – electric and acoustic guitars
 Colin Blunstone – vocals
 Mel Collins – saxophone
 Stuart Elliott – percussion, drums
 Alan Parsons – Fairlight programming
 David Paton – bass
 Andrew Powell – orchestral arrangements and conducting
 Chris Rainbow – vocals
 Eric Woolfson – all keyboards, vocals
 Lenny Zakatek – vocals
 Christopher Warren-Green – The Philharmonia Orchestra leader
 Storm Thorgerson – album cover design

Charts

Weekly charts

Year-end charts

Certifications

References

The Alan Parsons Project albums
Concept albums
1984 albums
Albums produced by Alan Parsons
Arista Records albums
Albums with cover art by Hipgnosis